The Rhyl Miniature Railway (Welsh: Rheilffordd Fach y Rhyl) is a  gauge miniature railway line located in Rhyl on the North Wales Coast. The line runs in a circle around a boating lake near the promenade, to the west of the town centre. The railway is operated by Rhyl Steam Preservation Trust, a Registered charity.

History

Work on the railway began in December 1910 when it was surveyed by Henry Greenly, to whom permission was given to start work in March 1911, and the railway opened to the public on 1 May 1911. The railway proved to be a great success in its first year. The railway was originally operated using a single Bassett-Lowke Class 10 Atlantic and 6 Bassett-Lowke carriages. In 1913 it was decided to buy a second Class 10 and the "cars de luxe" were built in the company's workshop. In 1920 the decision was taken to replace the two Class 10 with something more powerful due to them being stretched to their limits during peak season. The resulting engine was the first of the "Albion" locomotives.

It all came to an end in 1969. Rhyl Amusements was by then a subsidiary of Trust House Forte Leisure Ltd, whereas the Marine Lake itself belongs to the Borough Council. Trust House would not invest further in the Marine Lake site without a very long lease being granted, which the Council refused. As a result, Trust House decided to concentrate all its resources at Ocean Beach, and handed back the Marine Lake to the Council in 1970, completely bare.
The trackbed then lay bare until 1978 when it was relaid. The railway then started running trains on 1 July 1978.

The new central station building was opened in May 2007. The central station incorporates the Albert Barnes Room which displays the steam locomotive "Billie".

Locomotives

References

Further reading

External links

 Official website

Heritage railways in Denbighshire
Miniature railways in the United Kingdom
Museums in Denbighshire
Railway museums in Wales
15 in gauge railways in Wales
Rhyl